Biddick Academy (formerly Biddick School Sports College) is a coeducational secondary school and academy.  The current headteacher is Kate Morris. The school has a specific area for special educational needs students called the Unity Centre.

Notable former pupils
Matthew Wylie, swimmer

References

Academies in the City of Sunderland
Secondary schools in the City of Sunderland
Washington, Tyne and Wear